Khvoresh Rostam may refer to:
 Khvoresh Rostam District
 Khvoresh Rostam-e Jonubi Rural District
 Khvoresh Rostam-e Shomali Rural District